Jeff(rey) or Geoff(rey) Schwartz may refer to:

Jeff A. Schwartz (born 1964), American sports agent
Jeffrey E Schwartz (born 1958), American custom chassis and car builder
Jeffrey H. Schwartz (born 1948), American anthropologist
Jeffrey M. Schwartz, American psychiatrist
Geoff Schwartz (born 1986), American NFL football player

See also
 Jeffrey Schwarz (born 1969), filmmaker and producer